Nunda may refer to:

Places
In the United States:
 Nunda (town), New York
 Nunda (village), New York
 Nunda, South Dakota
 Nunda Township, McHenry County, Illinois
 Nunda Township, Michigan
 Nunda Township, Minnesota

Other uses 
 The Nunda, Eater of People, Swahili folk tale

See also 
 Nundah, Queensland, Australia